Dreta de l'Eixample is a neighborhood in the Eixample district of Barcelona, Catalonia (Spain). It is located east (visualised as dreta or "right") of Carrer de Balmes. It includes Plaça de Catalunya, the centre of the city, and the upscale streets Rambla de Catalunya and Passeig de Gràcia. It is the bourgeois neighborhood of the city, which makes the majority of its population belong to the upper class of Barcelona. Dreta de L'Eixample is one of the most luxurious neighborhoods of Barcelona.

References

Neighbourhoods of Barcelona
Eixample